Nuthe-Nieplitz Nature Park is a nature park and reserve in the state of Brandenburg, Germany. It covers an area of 623 km2 (241 sq mi). It was established in August 1999 and is located south-west of Berlin.

Nature parks in Brandenburg
Protected areas established in 1999